In enzymology, a cytokinin dehydrogenase is an enzyme that catalyzes the chemical reaction

N6-dimethylallyladenine + electron acceptor + H2O  adenine + 3-methylbut-2-enal + reduced acceptor

The 3 substrates of this enzyme are cytokinin (here represented by N6-dimethylallyladenine), electron acceptor, and H2O, whereas its 3 products are adenine, 3-methylbut-2-enal (or other aldehyde in case of different substrate), and reduced acceptor.

This enzyme belongs to the family of oxidoreductases, specifically those acting on the CH-NH group of donors with other acceptors.  The systematic name of this enzyme class is N6-dimethylallyladenine:acceptor oxidoreductase. Other names in common use include ''N''6-dimethylallyladenine:(acceptor) oxidoreductase, 6-N-dimethylallyladenine:acceptor oxidoreductase, and cytokinin oxidase/dehydrogenase abbreviated as CKX.

Structural studies

As of March 2016, there have been 18 structures deposited to PDB. 16 of these were of enzymes from maize and two from Arabidopsis.

References

 

EC 1.5.99
Enzymes of known structure